Poindexter may refer to:

 Poindexter (surname), a Jèrriais surname; origin and a list of people with the name

Characters
 Poindexter, a character in the animated TV series Felix the Cat (1959–1962), whose name has become a slang term meaning "a bookish or socially unskilled person"
 Poindexter, the main character in the film The People Under the Stairs
 Arnold Poindexter, a character in the film Revenge of the Nerds and its sequels

Places in the United States
 Poindexter, Georgia, an unincorporated community also known as Murrays Crossroads
 Poindexter, Virginia, an unincorporated community
 Poindexter Village, Columbus, Ohio, a historic public housing complex

Other uses
 Poindexter (mixtape), a 2009 mixtape by Childish Gambino

See also
 SS Alan Poindexter, a spaceship involved in Cygnus CRS OA-5